James Allan Barcia (born February 25, 1952) is an American Democratic politician from Michigan. He has served successively in the Michigan House of Representatives, the Michigan Senate, the United States House of Representatives and then again the Michigan Senate, from which he was term-limited in January 2011. He has served as County Executive of Bay County, Michigan, since January, 2017.

Early life and education
Barcia was born in Bay City, Michigan, and graduated from Bay City Central High School. He received a B.A. from Saginaw Valley State University in 1974. He was staff assistant to United States Senator Philip A. Hart of Michigan in 1971. Barcia also was a community service coordinator for the Michigan Blood Center, between 1974 and 1975, and he was an administrative assistant to Michigan state representative Donald J. Albosta, from 1975 to 1976.

Career
Barcia was a member of the Michigan State House of Representatives, from 1977 to 1983. He left the House after being elected to the Michigan Senate, where he served until he resigned in 1993 to enter the United States House of Representatives.

Barcia was elected as a Democrat from Michigan's 5th congressional district to the 103rd Congress and to the four succeeding Congresses, serving from January 3, 1993, to January 3, 2003. Like many Michigan Democrats outside of Ann Arbor, Detroit, and Flint, Barcia was quite moderate. He was opposed to abortion and gun control, and had a lifetime rating of 54 from the American Conservative Union—the highest of any Democrat from Michigan at the time.

After the United States 2000 Census, Barcia's district was dismantled by the Republican-controlled state legislature. Most of his district's territory was shifted to the 10th District, but his home in Bay City was merged with the neighboring 9th District of fellow Democrat Dale Kildee. The new district retained Barcia's district number (the 5th), but was geographically more Kildee's district. Under the circumstances, Barcia opted to run for his old seat in the State Senate and won.

On October 10, 2002, Jim Barcia was among the 81 House Democrats who voted in favor of authorizing the invasion of Iraq.

With Kildee announcing his retirement July 2011, Barcia considered running for his congressional seat in 2012.

In 2016, Barcia won a heated election to the position of Bay County Executive, after winning the Democratic primary against long-time incumbent Thomas L. Hickner in August. During the campaign, Barcia was accused of hiding campaign funds and using a misleading TV ad.

References

External links
Michigan Senate - Jim Barcia official government website
Floor Statements video clips
Project Vote Smart - Senator James 'Jim' Barcia (MI) profile
Follow the Money - Jim Barcia
2006 2004 2002 campaign contributions
Michigan Senate Democratic Caucus
Michigan Liberal - SD31
Blogging for Michigan Sen. Jim Barcia: Renewable and Alternative Fuels—Not just the right thing, but the SMART thing
 
 

1952 births
Living people
County executives in Michigan
Democratic Party Michigan state senators
Democratic Party members of the Michigan House of Representatives
Saginaw Valley State University alumni
Politicians from Bay City, Michigan
Democratic Party members of the United States House of Representatives from Michigan
20th-century American politicians
21st-century American politicians